Clay Center Township is a township in Clay County, Kansas, USA.  As of the 2000 census, its population was 368.

Geography
According to the USGS, it contains one cemetery, Broughton.

The streams of Dry Creek, Finney Creek, Lincoln Creek and Spring Creek run through this township.

Transportation
Clay Center Township contains one airport or landing strip, Clay Center Municipal Airport.

References
 USGS Geographic Names Information System (GNIS)

External links
 US-Counties.com
 City-Data.com

Townships in Clay County, Kansas
Townships in Kansas